The Hotel Warszawa is a historic skyscraper hotel in Warsaw, Poland, located on Warsaw Uprising Square along Świętokrzyska Street. Built between 1931 and 1933 in the Art Deco style as the Prudential House, and commonly known as the Prudential, it served as a base for the British Prudential Insurance Company. It was the tallest building in interwar Poland.

History

At the time of its construction, the eighteen-story, 66m Prudential House was the sixth tallest skyscraper in Europe, after the Telefónica Building, the Boerentoren, the Ullsteinhaus, the Siemensturm and the Bel-Air-Turm). Built using a steel framework, it was the tallest building in Warsaw until the Palace of Culture and Science was completed in 1955. Designed by Marcin Weinfeld, the Prudential House included office space on the lower stories and luxurious apartments further up. The steel framework, which was innovative at the time, was designed by Stefan Bryła and Wenczesław Poniż. Construction started in 1931 and used up over 2 million bricks, 2 thousand tonnes of concrete and 1500 tonnes of steel.

In 1936, a 27-meter antenna was constructed on the roof by professor Janusz Groszkowski, who started the first television broadcasts in Europe from the facility. The Prudential House soon became a symbol of modern Warsaw and was featured in numerous contemporary films and advertisements.

The structure was heavily damaged during World War II, particularly during the Warsaw Uprising, when it was hit by approximately 1,000 artillery shells, including by a 2-tonne Karl-Gerät mortar shell, leaving only the steel framework standing. The artillery damage bent the tower sideways, but it survived the war and was featured on numerous anti-war posters.

The tower was completely rebuilt after the war as a hotel, and its design style was changed from early modern to socialist realism. The building's original architect, Marcin Weinfeld, adapted the building to its new role as a hotel. The Hotel Warszawa opened in 1954 and included 375 rooms, a large restaurant, a café and a night club.

In 2002, the Hotel Warszawa closed and the building was sold. In 2010, it was purchased by the Likus Group, which began a slow and controversial refurbishment. The façade was returned to its pre-war art deco form, while the socialist-realist interior was completely gutted and rebuilt in a contemporary style. 

In November 2018, the 142-room Hotel Warszawa reopened as a luxury five-star hotel.

Gallery

See also 
PAST
Architecture of Warsaw
List of tallest buildings in Poland

External links

 Hotel Warszawa official website
 Emporis Building Database

References

Buildings and structures in Warsaw
Art Deco architecture in Poland
Art Deco skyscrapers
Buildings and structures completed in 1931
Commercial buildings completed in 1933
Prudential plc
Hotels established in 1954
Hotel buildings completed in 1933